Christian Alfred "Kick" van der Vall (born March 3, 1946) is a Dutch former professional footballer, who played as an attacking midfielder for Feyenoord, DWS, Vitesse, and is best known for his longer spell at FC Twente.

Career 
Van der Vall started playing youth football at Feyenoord. In 1963 he scored 3 goals against Ajax in the final of the Dutch youth championship. He made his Eredivisie debut on December 13 the same year scoring the winning goal against GVAV. He failed to win a regular starting position and after 4 years and 35 matches van der Vall moved to FC Twente.

Coached by Kees Rijvers he immediately became a starter and scored 7 goals his first season at Twente. After only 1 year van der Vall moved to DWS. In Amsterdam he played his first international football in the Inter-Cities Fairs Cup.

In 1977 Twente won the Dutch Cup. In 1979 van der Vall had to move as Twente wanted to bring in younger players. He played 2 more years at Vitesse before retiring from professional football. Vitesse was relegated in 1980, so van der Vall played his final year in the Eerste Divisie.

In the 2019/2020 season FC Twente will play in the shirt of the brand Kick's 21. A new brand, exclusively developed for FC Twente, that bears the name of Kick van der Vall. The new brand is a tribute to the midfielder, who always played with number 21.

References 

1946 births
Living people
Footballers from Rotterdam
Eredivisie players
Eerste Divisie players
Dutch footballers
Association football midfielders
AFC DWS players
Feyenoord players
FC Twente players
SBV Vitesse players